Natalya Ivanovna Sadova (née Koptyukh, born 15 July 1972 in Gorky) is a Russian discus thrower who has competed in many Olympic Games.

Career 
She won the gold medal at the 2004 Summer Olympics held in Athens in 2004, as well as bronze at the World Championship in 1997, a silver medal at the 1996 Summer Olympics in Atlanta, and placed fourth in 2000 Summer Olympics in Sydney. She also competed in the 2008 Summer Olympics in Beijing, immediately after serving a two-year ban for doping, but failed to advance to the final round.

She originally won the gold medal at the 2001 World Championships in Athletics, but lost it due to a positive drugs test for caffeine. She was later cleared and let off a suspension, but in May 2006 she tested positive for an anabolic steroid and accepted a ban.

Her best performance was 70.02 meters on 23 June 1999, at the Olympic meet in Thessaloniki, Greece.

See also
List of doping cases in athletics

References

External links
 
 Natalya Sadova at European Athletics (archived)
 
 

1972 births
Living people
Sportspeople from Nizhny Novgorod
Russian female discus throwers
Olympic female discus throwers
Olympic athletes of Russia
Olympic gold medalists for Russia
Olympic silver medalists for Russia
Olympic gold medalists in athletics (track and field)
Olympic silver medalists in athletics (track and field)
Athletes (track and field) at the 1996 Summer Olympics
Athletes (track and field) at the 2000 Summer Olympics
Athletes (track and field) at the 2004 Summer Olympics
Athletes (track and field) at the 2008 Summer Olympics
Medalists at the 1996 Summer Olympics
Medalists at the 2004 Summer Olympics
Universiade gold medalists for Russia
Universiade gold medalists in athletics (track and field)
Medalists at the 1995 Summer Universiade
Medalists at the 1997 Summer Universiade
Goodwill Games medalists in athletics
Competitors at the 1998 Goodwill Games
Competitors at the 2001 Goodwill Games
World Athletics Championships athletes for Russia
World Athletics Championships medalists
Athletes stripped of World Athletics Championships medals
European Athletics Championships medalists
Russian Athletics Championships winners
Doping cases in athletics
Russian sportspeople in doping cases